Snowboarding at the 2017 Asian Winter Games was held in Sapporo, Japan between 19–25 February at Sapporo Teine (slalom events) and Sapporo Bankei Ski Area (halfpipe). Snowboarding returns to the games program after missing the last edition in 2011 in Kazakhstan. A total of six events were contested, three each for men and women.

Schedule

Medalists

Men

Women

Medal table

Participating nations
A total of 58 athletes from 11 nations competed in snowboarding at the 2017 Asian Winter Games:

 
 
 
 
 
 
 
 
 
 
 

* Australia as guest nation, was ineligible to win any medals.

References

External links
Official Results Book – Snowboard

 
2017 Asian Winter Games events
2017
2017 in snowboarding